The Château de la Renaudie  is a ruined château in Saint-Front-la-Rivière, Dordogne, Nouvelle-Aquitaine, France.

Châteaux in Dordogne
Ruined castles in Nouvelle-Aquitaine
Monuments historiques of Dordogne